Leslie Wayne (born 1953, Landstuhl, Germany) is a visual artist who lives and works in New York. Wayne is best known for her "highly dimensional paintings".

Early life and education 

Leslie Wayne was born in Landstühl, Germany, to American parents and grew up in Los Angeles and Newport Beach. At the age of 7, she was taking private art lessons and attended classes on the weekends throughout high school. Her first two years of undergraduate work at the University of California, Santa Barbara's College of Creative Studies focused on the figure, plein-air landscapes, and printmaking. She created a suite of etchings and aquatints based on the photographs of Jacques Henri Lartigue, with whom she had begun a correspondence. 
 
Wayne moved to Paris and lived there from 1974 to 1975, where she attended French classes at the Alliance Française, and continued to paint on her own and in various small ateliers. At the Alliance Française, Wayne met an Israeli man, with whom she developed a relationship. After having returned to California, she moved to Israel in 1975 to live with him and stayed there until 1980. In Israel, she continued to paint and explore other creative outlets, including ceramics and children's book illustration. Wayne returned to Southern California in 1980 and two years later moved to New York City, where she enrolled in Parsons School of Design. At Parsons, Wayne became a sculpture major and studied with Ronald Bladen and Don Porcaro, whom she later married in 1987. She graduated with honors, with a BFA in sculpture in 1984.

Work

Early work 
Wayne's early work was driven by a focus on technique and observation. Her inspiration came from French Impressionism, particularly the paintings of Van Gogh, Lautrec and Manet, and the photographs of Jacques Henri Lartigue. Only after her classes at the Académie de la Grande Chaumière, did she first venture into abstraction.

Wayne had her first solo show at the Jerusalem Theatre Gallery in 1979 of works that were inspired by Georgia O'Keeffe's desert landscape paintings. Returning to California, she continued to paint plein-air landscapes. With the hills of Laguna Beach as her source, Wayne developed a deep love for and identification with the landscape and geology of the Western United States.

New York 
Wayne moved to New York City in 1982 and transferred to Parsons School of Design. While a student there, she focused on sculpture, and was inspired by the work of David Smith. After graduation, Wayne returned to painting, developing a minimalist abstract style inspired by the many trips she and her husband, sculptor Don Porcaro made to the Southwest. She exhibited these works in her first New York solo show at 55 Mercer Street Gallery. Although this show resulted in the attention of the New York art scene, Wayne longed for the creative excitement she felt when she was making sculpture. Experimenting in her studio, Wayne began challenging the physical limitations of paint, resulting in a style that became the central focus of her career. In 1992 she received a fellowship to the renown artist's colony, Yaddo where she worked on refining her new approach, and showed these paintings at 55 Mercer Gallery later that year. Based on the success of that show, she was invited to join Jack Shainman Gallery, where she continues to be represented.

Wayne's works, hybrids of sculpture and painting, range from small scale to larger multi-paneled and shaped paintings. Wayne's themes explore the intersection of abstraction and figuration and forms in nature, as well as perception and the relationship between object and image by engaging and challenging the conventional notions of the painting medium.

Career 
Wayne had her first two New York solo shows at 55 Mercer Street Gallery in 1990 and 1992. In 1993 she joined Jack Shainman Gallery and had her first solo show that year.

Throughout the late 1990s and into the 2000s Wayne exhibited with L.A. Louver in Los Angeles, Solomon Projects in Atlanta, GA, Byron Cohen Gallery for Contemporary Art in Kansas City, MO and Galerie Bugdahn und Kaimer in Düsseldorf, Germany.

Her work was featured in the 44th Biennial Exhibition of Contemporary American Painting: Painting Outside Painting, curated by Terrie Sultan for the Corcoran Gallery of Art in Washington, D.C. in 1995. 

In 2002, an installation of sixty of Wayne's paintings inaugurated the new Samuel Dorsky Museum of Art in New Paltz, NY as part of an installation with 60 of Porcaro's small scale sculptures. The show was expanded in 2004, becoming a survey of her and Porcaro's work from the previous decade. Titled "The Object of Time: Charting A Decade", the exhibition traveled to the University Gallery at the University of Florida in Gainesville, the Crossley Gallery at the Ringling School of Art and Design, and the Red Gallery at the Savannah College of Art and Design.

In 2011, the Halsey Institute of Contemporary Art at the College of Charleston mounted a five-year survey of Wayne's recent work. A catalogue and video interview accompanied the exhibition. The show traveled to the Visual Arts Center of Richmond, the Joseloff Gallery at the University of Hartford and the Foosaner Art Museum. In 2014, the Abroms Engel Institute of Contemporary Art at the University of Alabama inaugurated their newly opened museum with a survey of Wayne's paintings entitled "Mind The Gap."

Wayne's work is in many public collections throughout the United States and abroad, including the Birmingham Museum of Art, Birmingham, AL; The Cooper Hewitt, Smithsonian Design Museum, NYC; The Corcoran Gallery of Art, Washington, D.C.; Collezione Maramotti, Reggio Emilia, Italy; the Davis Museum, Wellesley, MA; Fondation Cartier pour l'Art Contemporain, Paris, France; Harvard University Business School Schwartz Art Collection, Cambridge, MA; Colección Jumex, Mexico City, Mexico; Neuberger Museum of Art, Purchase, NY; The Parrish Art Museum, Watermill, NY; Portland Museum of Art, Portland, OR; The Miami Museum of Contemporary Art, Miami, FL; and Reed College Special Collections Library, Portland, OR, among others.

Her exhibitions have been reviewed and featured in The New York Times, the Los Angeles Times, Artforum, ARTnews, Art in America, Art & Antiques, The New Yorker, New York Newsday, The Philadelphia Inquirer, Art Papers, The Atlanta Journal-Constitution, the San Francisco Chronicle, The Kansas City Star, The Wichita Eagle, The Guardian, the New Art Examiner, The Washington Times, The Washington Post, and the Chicago Tribune, as well as journals and publications abroad. 

Wayne is also an occasional writer. Her interviews of fellow artists include Sharon Butler, Lisa Corinne Davis, Lesley Dill, Beverly Fishman, Beatrice Pediconi, Elise Siegel, Elena Sisto, Monica Majoli, Medrie MacPhee and Barbara Takenaga, and have been published in the online art magazines, Artcritical, BOMB and Two Coats of Paint.

Wayne has had 12 solo exhibitions with Jack Shainman Gallery since 1993, including her most recent 2021 exhibition entitled "The Universe is on the Inside."

Awards 
Wayne is a member of the National Academy of Design (class of 2016) and currently serves as Vice Chair of their Board of Governors. Other honors and awards include the New York Foundation for the Arts Fellowship in Painting (2018, 2006), a John Simon Guggenheim Memorial Foundation Award in Fine Arts (2017), Joan Mitchell Foundation Artist's Grant (2012), Buhl Foundation Award for Abstract Photography (2004), Adolph and Esther Gottlieb Foundation Artist's Grant (1994), Hillwood Art Museum/New York State Council on the Arts Projects Residency Grant (1993), Yaddo Artist's Residency Fellowship (1992), Change Inc. Artist's Emergency Grant (1985), Artist's Space Exhibition Grant (1985, 1990), and a Pollock-Krasner Foundation Artist's Grant (1985).  

Public art works include a 2016 commission by the MTA Arts & Design program for windows at the newly renovated Bay Parkway Station in Brooklyn, NY.

Personal life 
Wayne lives and works in New York City with her husband, sculptor Don Porcaro.

References

1953 births
Living people
20th-century German painters
German abstract artists
People from Landstuhl
University of California, Santa Barbara alumni
21st-century German painters